Thomas Charnock (1587–1648) was an English politician who sat in the House of Commons in 1624.

Charnock was the second son of  Robert Charnock, of Charnock or Astley, Lancashire. He lived at Astley Hall, Chorley, Lancashire. In 1624, he was elected Member of Parliament for Newton in the Happy Parliament. 
 
Charnock was elder brother of Roger Charnock who was MP for Newton in 1614.

References

1580s births
1645 deaths
English MPs 1624–1625